The High-Jinkers was a musical variety radio program broadcast during the late 1920s on New York's WEAF each Saturday evening at 7:30pm.

One of the featured performers was blind tenor Guy Hunter who accompanied himself at the piano. Born in 1886, Hunter was one of the first performers to start singing into a microphone. Hunter recalled:
One of my first jobs was pianist in one of William Fox's first New York theaters, a little place up on 125th Street. I played there for $12 a week. Then I sang illustrated songs for three years.

When other members of the cast were performing, Hunter sat in a corner of the studio, keeping time with his foot, until the small boy he employed as his guide would lead him to the piano. Hunter often sang songs in dialect.

References

1920s American radio programs
American music radio programs
NBC radio programs